The Cambodia Bay Cycling Tour is an annual professional road bicycle racing stage race held in Cambodia since 2020. The race is part of the UCI Asia Tour and was classified by the International Cycling Union (UCI) as a 2.2 category race. The first edition was won by Laotian rider Ariya Phounsavath.

Winners

Jerseys
The leader of the overall general classification receives a yellow jersey. There are also three other classifications. The winner of the points classification (sprints) wears a green jersey, a red jersey for the winner of the mountain classification and a white jersey for the best young rider.

References

Cycle racing in Cambodia
UCI Asia Tour races
Recurring sporting events established in 2020